Elections to Dartford Borough Council were held on 6 May 1999.  The whole council was up for election. The Labour party retained an overall majority on the council.

Election result

|}

Ward results

References
 

1999 English local elections
1999
1990s in Kent